Putkar Hembrom is an Indian politician and member of the Bharatiya Janata Party. From 2005 to 2009, Hembrom was a member of the Jharkhand Legislative Assembly from the Chaibasa constituency in West Singhbhum district.

References 

Year of birth missing (living people)
Living people
Bharatiya Janata Party politicians from Jharkhand
Jharkhand MLAs 2005–2009
Santali people